Julian Veen Uldal (born 11 June 1997) is a Norwegian footballer who played as a full-back.

He hails from Stavanger, and started his career in Tasta IL.

He made his first team debut for Viking FK in the 2014 Norwegian Football Cup. He later made his league debut as a substitute in the last game of the 2014 season. After spending 2016 in Randaberg he moved back and forth between Stavanger and Oslo, and clubs like Brodd and Lyn.

References

1997 births
Living people
Sportspeople from Stavanger
Norwegian footballers
Viking FK players
Randaberg IL players
Lyn Fotball players
Eliteserien players
Association football forwards
Norway youth international footballers